The North Georgia Conference is a regional episcopal area, (similar to a diocese) of the United Methodist Church. (Not to be confused with the "Annual Conference" which is the yearly meeting of the North Georgia Conference itself.) This conference serves the northern half of the state of Georgia, with its administrative offices and the office of the bishop located in Atlanta, GA. It is part of the Southeastern Jurisdictional Conference. The bishop is Sue Haupert-Johnson.

Bishops

1996 - 2008:  Bishop G. Lindsey Davis
2008 - 2016:  Bishop B. Michael Watson
Bishop B. Michael Watson began service on September 7, 2008.
2016 - Current: Sue Haupert-Johnson 
Bishop Sue Haupert-Johnson began service on September 1, 2016.

Districts
The North Georgia Annual Conference is further subdivided into 8 smaller regions, called "districts," which provide further administrative functions for the operation of local churches in cooperation with each other. This structure is vital to Methodism, and is referred to as connectionalism. The Districts that comprise the North Georgia Conference are:

(1) Central West
(2) Central North
(3) Central East
(4) Central South
(5) North West
(6) North East
(7) South East
(8) South West

See also
Annual Conferences of the United Methodist Church

External links
North Georgia Conference of The United Methodist Church

Methodism in Georgia (U.S. state)
United Methodism by region
United Methodist Annual Conferences